Ono (小野) and Ōno/Oono/Ohno (大野) are Japanese surnames. Ono means "small field" and Ōno means "large field". Both are used as Japanese surnames.  All Japanese names Ō can be written as Ō, O, Oh, Oo. The following people were born in Japan, unless otherwise noted:

Ono/Ōno 
 Allen K. Ono (1933-2016), U.S. Army officer, first lieutenant general of Japanese-American descent, born in Hawaii
  
 Ono no Azumabito (d. 757), Japanese court official during the Nara period, governor of Bizen province
 Ōno no Azumabito (d. 742), official, during the same period, who held the Imperial position of Chinjufu-shōgun
 Ohno no Mataka (782–843) aristocrat and government official
 Chizu Ono, photographer
 Daisuke Ono (born 1978), voice actor
 Frank H. Ono, Japanese-American soldier
 Fuyumi Ono, author
 Ōno Harunaga, general under Toyotomi Hideyori
 Hitoshi Ono, rugby player
, Japanese ice hockey player
 Jiro Ono (chef) (born 1925), chef of Sukiyabashi Jiro, three-Michelin-starred Japanese restaurant
 Kaoru Ōno (born 1941), author
 Kaoru Ono (mathematician) (born 1962), geometer
 Katsuo Ōno, Japanese composer
 Kazushi Ono, orchestra and opera conductor
 Ken Ono, Japanese-American mathematician
 Kenshō Ono, voice actor
, Japanese golfer
 Kōsei Ono, rugby player
 Ōno Kurobei, chief retainer of the Banshū Akō Domain
 Lisa Ono, Japanese-Brazilian bossa nova singer
 Machiko Ono, actress
 Marina Ōno, voice actress
, Japanese footballer
 Masatoshi Ono, rock/heavy metal singer
, Japanese writer
 Minoru Ōno, the real name of Saburō Kitajima, Enka singer
, Japanese high jumper
, Japanese actress
, Japanese politician
 Ryōko Ono, voice actress
, Japanese long-distance runner
 Ryumo Ono, Japanese basketball player
 Santa J. Ono (born 1962), a Japanese-American biologist, university administrator and board member
, Japanese ice hockey player
 Shinji Ono, footballer
 Shinjiro Ono, former deputy commissioner of the Japan Patent Office
 Shoko Ono (born 1981), Japanese ice hockey player
 Shunzo Ono, footballer
 Susumu Ōno, linguist
 Takashi Ono (born 1931), gymnast and Olympic medalist
 Takashi Ono (judoka) (born 1980), martial arts practitioner
 Takashi Ono (mathematician) (born 1928), number theorist
 Toshihiro Ono, manga artist
, musician, artist, feminist and peace activist who married John Lennon
, Japanese judoka
, Japanese professional baseball player
 Yūki Ōno, wrestler
 Yūki Ono, voice actor
, Japanese weightlifter

Ohno 
 Apolo Ohno, American speed-skater
 Hideo Ohno, Japanese physicist
 Kassius Ohno, ring name of American pro-wrestler Chris Spradlin (a.k.a. Chris Hero)
 Kazuo Ohno, Japanese butoh dancer and choreographer
 Kiyofumi Ohno, male Japanese pop singer/songwriter
 Mikiyo Ohno, female Japanese pop singer
 Mitsugi Ohno, Japanese-American glassblower
 Mitsuki Ono, Japanese snowboarder
 Saori Sarina Ohno, Japanese pianist raised in Germany
 Satoshi Ohno member of the Japanese idol group Arashi
 Shinobu Ohno, Japanese footballer
 Susumu Ohno, American geneticist
 Taiichi Ohno, Toyota executive
 Yoshinori Ohno, Japanese politician
 Yuji Ohno, Japanese jazz musician
, Japanese ice hockey player

Other people
 Barry Ono,  stage name of Frederick Valentine Harrison, British variety theatre performer and collector of penny dreadfuls

See also
 Ohno, the name of an orbot from the animated series Mighty Orbots
 Oh No (disambiguation)

Japanese-language surnames